Lepidothamnus fonkii is a species of conifer in the family Podocarpaceae. It is found in Argentina and Chile. It is threatened by habitat loss.

References

External links
 Conifers Around the World: Lepidothamnus fonkii - Magellan Dwarf-cypress

Podocarpaceae
Vulnerable plants
Taxonomy articles created by Polbot